Felix Township may refer to:
Felix Township, Grundy County, Illinois
Felix Township, Grundy County, Iowa